Cyrtandra calyptribracteata is a species of Cyrtandra of the family Gesneriaceae.

References

calyptribracteata
Taxa named by Reinier Cornelis Bakhuizen van den Brink (born 1911)